Led Zeppelin were an English rock band that formed in 1968.

Led Zeppelin may also refer to:
Led Zeppelin (album)
Led Zeppelin Boxed Set
Led Zeppelin DVD

See also 
Led Zeppelin II
Led Zeppelin III
Led Zeppelin IV
Led Zeppelin Boxed Set 2
Led Zeppelin discography
Led Zeppelin Remasters 
"Led Zep", a song by Blonde Redhead from In an Expression of the Inexpressible